Ryan Williams (born October 11, 1996) is a former American soccer player who plays as an attacking midfielder.

Career
On January 9, 2019, USL Championship side New Mexico United announced they had signed Ryan Williams ahead of their inaugural 2019 season. Williams announced his retirement from playing professional soccer following New Mexico's 2020 season.

Career statistics

References

External links
 
 Profile at JBU Athletics

1996 births
Living people
Charlotte Eagles players
John Brown Golden Eagles men's soccer players
New Mexico United players
People from Honolulu County, Hawaii
USL League Two players
USL Championship players
American soccer players
Association football midfielders
Soccer players from Honolulu
Soccer players from Colorado
People from Golden, Colorado
Sportspeople from the Denver metropolitan area